Regina Graves is an American set decorator. She was nominated for an Academy Award in the category Best Production Design for the film The Irishman.

Selected filmography 
 The Irishman (2019; co-nominated with Bob Shaw)

References

External links 

Living people
Place of birth missing (living people)
Year of birth missing (living people)
American set decorators
21st-century American women
Primetime Emmy Award winners